{{DISPLAYTITLE:C29H36O4}}
The molecular formula C29H36O4 (molar mass: 448.59 g/mol, exact mass: 448.2614 u) may refer to:

 Algestone acetophenide, or dihydroxyprogesterone acetophenide (DHPA)
 Pawhuskin A

Molecular formulas